Atter Shisha is a village and union council in Mansehra District, Khyber Pakhtunkhwa province, Pakistan. It is situated on the New Naran Highway,  from the city of Mansehra.

Historical background
The name of this village, Atter Shisha (i.e. lit. 'Bottle of Attar Scent), originated, according to a charming local legend, when the Mughal Queen Nur Jahan was passing by en route to Kashmir and stopping at  this location during her short stay, dropping an expensive and beautiful perfume bottle here; and henceforth, this place was named after this bottle.

Population and people
The Common dress of the people is Shalwar Qamiz, although government officials and students also wear trousers and coats. Turbans, Karakul caps and 'Patti' caps are worn by the people. Men often wear waistcoats over Shalwar Qamiz. Women's dresses are also very simple and consist of Shalwar Qamiz, with  Dopatta or Chadder scarves as head-covering.

The food of inhabitants of the Town is very simple. Maize, wheat and rice are eaten everywhere. Home-made Ghee and  Lassi  are also consumed by the rural folk.

Large majority of the population more than 60% depends upon agriculture for their subsistence. However, income from agriculture is too meagre to support the population. As a result, many of them have found work in other parts of the country or left for overseas. Other minor professions to which people have taken to, include those of cobblers, blacksmiths, goldsmiths, weavers, barbers, labourers etc.

The area was affected during the 2005 earthquake in Kashmir and the Hazara region.

References

Union councils of Mansehra District
Populated places in Mansehra District